Events in the year 1979 in Japan. It corresponds to Shōwa 54 (昭和54年) in the Japanese calendar.

Incumbents
 Emperor: Hirohito (Emperor Shōwa)
 Prime Minister: Masayoshi Ōhira (L–Kagawa, 2nd term from November 9)
 Chief Cabinet Secretary: Rokusuke Tanaka (L–Fukuoka) until November 9, Masayoshi Itō (L–Fukushima)
 Chief Justice of the Supreme Court: Masao Okahara until March 31, Takaaki Hattori from April 2
 President of the House of Representatives: Shigeru Hori (L–Saga) until February 1, Hirokichi Nadao (L–Hiroshima) until September 7 and again from October 30
 President of the House of Councillors: Ken Yasui (L–Tokyo)
 Diet sessions: 87th (regular session opened in December 1978, to May 14), 88th (extraordinary, August 30 to September 7), 89th (special, October 30 to November 16), 90th (extraordinary, November 26 to December 11), 91st (regular, December 21 to 1980, May 19)

Governors
Aichi Prefecture: Yoshiaki Nakaya 
Akita Prefecture: Yūjirō Obata (until 30 April); Kikuji Sasaki (starting 30 April) 
Aomori Prefecture: Shunkichi Takeuchi (until 25 February); Masaya Kitamura (starting 26 February)
Chiba Prefecture: Kiichi Kawakami 
Ehime Prefecture: Haruki Shiraishi 
Fukui Prefecture: Heidayū Nakagawa 
Fukuoka Prefecture: Hikaru Kamei 
Fukushima Prefecture: Isao Matsudaira 
Gifu Prefecture: Yosuke Uematsu 
Gunma Prefecture: Ichiro Shimizu 
Hiroshima Prefecture: Hiroshi Miyazawa 
Hokkaido: Naohiro Dōgakinai 
Hyogo Prefecture: Tokitada Sakai
Ibaraki Prefecture: Fujio Takeuchi 
Ishikawa Prefecture: Yōichi Nakanishi 
Iwate Prefecture: Tadashi Chida (until 30 April);  (starting 30 April)
Kagawa Prefecture: Tadao Maekawa 
Kagoshima Prefecture: Kaname Kamada 
Kanagawa Prefecture: Kazuji Nagasu 
Kochi Prefecture: Chikara Nakauchi  
Kumamoto Prefecture: Issei Sawada 
Kyoto Prefecture: Yukio Hayashida 
Mie Prefecture: Ryōzō Tagawa 
Miyagi Prefecture: Sōichirō Yamamoto 
Miyazaki Prefecture: Hiroshi Kuroki (until 16 June); Suketaka Matsukata (starting 5 August)
Nagano Prefecture: Gon'ichirō Nishizawa 
Nagasaki Prefecture: Kan'ichi Kubo 
Nara Prefecture: Ryozo Okuda 
Niigata Prefecture: Takeo Kimi 
Oita Prefecture: Masaru Taki (until 27 April); Morihiko Hiramatsu (starting 28 April)
Okayama Prefecture: Shiro Nagano 
Okinawa Prefecture: Junji Nishime 
Osaka Prefecture: Ryōichi Kuroda (until 22 April); Sakae Kishi (starting 23 April)
Saga Prefecture: Sunao Ikeda (until 22 April); Kumao Katsuki (starting 23 April)
Saitama Prefecture: Yawara Hata 
Shiga Prefecture: Masayoshi Takemura 
Shiname Prefecture: Seiji Tsunematsu 
Shizuoka Prefecture: Keizaburō Yamamoto 
Tochigi Prefecture: Yuzuru Funada 
Tokushima Prefecture: Yasunobu Takeichi 
Tokyo: Ryōkichi Minobe (until 22 April); Shun'ichi Suzuki (starting 23 April)
Tottori Prefecture: Kōzō Hirabayashi 
Toyama Prefecture: Kokichi Nakada 
Wakayama Prefecture: Shirō Kariya  
Yamagata Prefecture: Seiichirō Itagaki 
Yamaguchi Prefecture: Toru Hirai 
Yamanashi Prefecture: Kunio Tanabe (until 16 February); Kōmei Mochizuki (starting 17 February)

Events

January 26 to 28 - According to Japan National Police Agency confirmed report, a man with a hunting gun pushed into a bank branch for 42 hours, a bank robbery who took more than 30 hostages in Sumiyoshi-ku, Osaka, killing two banking staff and two police officers, the suspect was shot dead by special riot police on 28 January.
February - The government is rocked by yet another bribery case: the Douglas-Grumman scandal
March 20 - According to Japan Fire and Disaster Management Agency confirmed report, at least 16 construction workers death by Daishimizu Tunnel fire, during under construction in Minakami, Gunma Prefecture. 
June 28 – 29 – 5th G7 summit held in Tokyo.
July 1 – Sony Walkman goes on sale.
July 11 - According to Japan National Police Agency confirmed report, a vehicle caught fire; 173 vehicles burned in the Nihonzaka Road Tunnel, Tomei Expressway, Shizuoka City, total seven person were lost to fire. 
October 7 – 1979 Japanese general election
October 19 – 13 US Marines die in fire at Camp Fuji, Shizuoka Prefecture, caused by Typhoon Tip.
November – Japan Project Industry Council (JAPIC) was found as voluntary organization. (date unknown)

Popular culture

Arts and entertainment
In film, Vengeance Is Mine by Shōhei Imamura won the Best film award at the Japan Academy Prize, at the Blue Ribbon Awards and at the Mainichi Film Award, Taiyō o Nusunda Otoko by Kazuhiko Hasegawa won Best film at the Yokohama Film Festival and at the Hochi Film Awards. For a list of Japanese films released in 1979 see Japanese films of 1979.

In manga,  the winners of the Shogakukan Manga Award were Doza no Ippon Tsuri by Yusuke Aoyagi (general) and Toward the Terra and Kaze to Ki no Uta by Keiko Takemiya (shōnen or shōjo). Tonda Couple by Kimio Yanagisawa (shōnen) and The Star of Cottonland by Yumiko Ōshima (shōjo) won the Kodansha Manga Award. For a list of manga released in 1979 see :Category:1979 manga.

In music, the 30th Kōhaku Uta Gassen was won by the Red Team (women). Hideki Saijo won the FNS Music Festival and Judy Ongg won the 21st Japan Record Award.

In television, see: 1979 in Japanese television.

Japan hosted the Miss International 1979 beauty pageant, won by Filipina Melanie Marquez.

Sports
In athletics (track and field) Japan hosted the Asian Championships and was first in the medal table with 20 gold medals and a total of 59 medals.

In baseball Hiroshima Carp won the Japan Series.

In basketball Japan hosted the ABC Championship and won the second place behind China.

In football (soccer) Japan hosted the FIFA World Youth Championship, won by Argentina. Fujita Engineering won the Japan Soccer League. For the champions of the regional leagues see: 1979 Japanese Regional Leagues. For more see: 1979 in Japanese football.

Births
 January 1: Koichi Domoto, idol and singer
 January 3: Rie Tanaka, voice actress
 January 7: Yōko Honna, voice actress
 January 9: Tomiko Van, singer (Do As Infinity)
 January 17
 Masae Ueno, judoka
 Takafumi Nishitani, former short-track skater
 January 18: Sachiko Kojima, voice actress
 February 2: Yuichi Tsuchiya, actor
 February 9: Akinori Iwamura, former professional baseball player
 February 19: Miki Furukawa, musician
 March 8: Jasmine You, musician (died 2009)
 March 20: Shinnosuke Abe, former professional baseball player
 March 26: Hiromi Uehara, jazz composer and pianist
 April 4: Bunko Kanazawa, AV idol
 April 7: Keiichi Hirano, former professional baseball pitcher
 April 10: Tsuyoshi Domoto, entertainer (KinKi Kids)
 April 18: Yusuke Kamiji, actor 
 May 14: Jun Ideguchi, football player
 May 28: Atsushi Nomi, baseball pitcher
 May 30: Rie Kugimiya, voice actress and singer
 June 9: Ryoko Kuninaka, actress and singer
 June 11: Rino Nakasone Razalan, Japanese-American dancer and choreographer
 June 18: Yumiko Kobayashi, voice actress
 June 23: Shigeki Tsujimoto, football player
 July 3: Sayuri Katayama, actress, singer and lyricist
 July 16 
 Mai Nakamura, backstroke swimmer
 Kinya Kotani, singer
 July 21: Haruki Mizuno, AV and gravure idol
 July 26: Yukihiro Aoba, football player
 August 2: Hitoshi Sogahata, football player
 August 7: Seiji Koga, football player
 August 13: Taizō Sugimura, politician
 August 28: Yuki Maeda, singer
 September 18
 Ryu Saito, football player
 Junichi Inamoto, football player
 September 26: Naomichi Marufuji, professional wrestler
 September 27: Shinji Ono, football player
 September 30: Yuta Minami, football player
 October 3: Yuri Ebihara, model and actress
 October 6: Emi Naito, softball player
 October 11: Reiko Takagaki, model and actress
 October 12: Rie Tomosaka, actress and popstar
 October 19: Hiromi Yanagihara, J-pop singer (died 1999)
 October 30: Yukie Nakama, actress, singer, and idol
 November 1: Atsuko Enomoto, voice actress
 November 15: Aki Nawa, ten-pin bowler
 November 24: Sachiyo Shibata, kickboxer
 November 26: Tetsuya Oishi, football player
 November 29: Shosei Koda, terrorism victim (died 2004)
 December 7
 Hirokazu Otsubo, football player
 Ayako Fujitani, actress
 December 9
 Aiko Uemura, freestyle skier
 Olivia Lufkin, singer-songwriter
 December 10 – Keiko Nemoto, voice actress
 December 21: Hinano Yoshikawa, fashion model and singer
 December 23: Yukifumi Murakami, javelin thrower
 December 25: Tatsuya Ishikawa, football player
 December 26: Kazuhiko Ikematsu, wrestler
 December 29: Moe Oshikiri, model

Deaths
 January 12: Shunsaku Kudō, Imperial Japanese Navy officer (b. 1901)
 January 23: Motoo Ōtaguro, music critic (b. 1893)
 January 29: Yusuke Hagihara, astronomer (b. 1897)
 February 24: Yoshie Shiratori, murderer (b. 1907)
 March 25: Akinoumi Setsuo, sumo wrestler (b. 1914)
 March 26: Iwao Matsuda, senior officer in the Imperial Japanese army (b. 1895)
 April 17: Yukio Tsuda, football player (b. 1917)
 May 23: Hiroshi Ohshita, professional baseball player (b. 1922)
 May 29: Eddie Imazu, art director (b. 1897)
 July 8: Sin-Itiro Tomonaga, physicist (b. 1906)
 July 20: Shōji Yamagishi, photography critic, curator, and magazine editor (b. 1930)
 July 27: Sōkichi Takagi, admiral and political figure (b. 1893)
 August 24: Shigeharu Nakano, author and Communist Party politician (b. 1902)
 August 25: Sōgen Asahina, Rinzai zen master (b. 1891)
 September 17: Mitsuru Yoshida, author and naval officer (b. 1923)
 September 30: Shiina Etsusaburo, foreign minister of Japan from 1964 to 1966 (b. 1898)
 October 22: Mieko Kamiya, psychiatrist (b. 1914)
 November 16: Ichirō Saitō, film composer (b. 1909)
 December 25: Kenji Tomiki, aikido and judo teacher (b. 1900)

See also
 1979 in Japanese television
 List of Japanese films of 1979

References

 
Japan
Years of the 20th century in Japan